We Are Lanzarote  is a left-wing Canarian and ecologist political party, born in 2015 after a process of confluence between various parties in the Canarian island of Lanzarote.

History
Somos run for the local and insular elections of 2015, gaining 2 seats in the Cabildo of Lanzarote and 9 local councillors, including 3 in Arrecife (the capital of the island).

References

External links
 Website of the Somos Lanzarote

Political parties in the Canary Islands
Canarian nationalist parties
Political parties established in 2015
2015 establishments in the Canary Islands
Lanzarote
Left-wing nationalist parties